The Jerome Bonaparte Pillow House (sometimes the Thompson-Pillow House) is a historic house at 718 Perry Street in Helena, Arkansas. Architect George Barber designed the house, and it was built by Jerome B. Pillow in 1896. The building was donated to the Phillips Community College of the University of Arkansas Foundation and was restored by that body as well as several members of the community who were successful in restoring the property to its original Queen Anne beauty. The Thompson-Pillow House was placed on the National Register of Historic Places in 1973 and was opened after restoration in 1997.

Architecture

The Pillow - Thompson House exhibits many key characteristics of Queen Anne architecture, and is one of the finest examples of the style in Helena. The wraparound porch, overhanging gables, ornamented eaves, spindel work, polygon tower, and terra cotta roof tiles are all common in homes of the period built in the Queen Anne style. The exterior columns and balustrades are also common in similar structures.

See also
 National Register of Historic Places listings in Phillips County, Arkansas

References

Houses on the National Register of Historic Places in Arkansas
Houses in Phillips County, Arkansas
Queen Anne architecture in Arkansas
Houses completed in 1896
National Register of Historic Places in Phillips County, Arkansas
Historic district contributing properties in Arkansas